The 2015 Four Continents Figure Skating Championships was a Senior ISU figure skating championship held in the 2014–15 season. Skaters competed in the disciplines of men's singles, ladies' singles, pair skating, and ice dancing for the title of Four Continents Champion. The event's name refers to the Americas, Asia, Africa, and Oceania, which are four of the continents represented in the Olympic rings, omitting Europe.

In February 2015, the Korea Skating Union organised a competition that was held at the Mokdong Ice Rink in Seoul, South Korea. The rink has a seating capacity of 5,000 spectators.

The 2015 competition featured a total of ninety-one athletes from fifteen nations from North America, Africa, Asia and Oceania. There were twenty-six competitors in the men's event and nineteen competitors in the ladies' event. There was also be pair teams and thirteen ice dancing teams.

Qualification
The competition was open to skaters from non-European member nations of the International Skating Union who reach the age of 15 before July 1, 2014. The corresponding competition for European skaters will be the 2015 European Championships.

National associations selected up to three skaters to compete in both singles disciplines and three couples in both Pairs and Ice Dancing. Selection is based on each associations own criteria but the ISU mandates that their selections achieve a minimum technical elements score (TES) at an international event prior to the Four Continents.

Minimum TES

Entries

Withdrawals
 On 10 February 2015, Japanese ice dancers Cathy Reed / Chris Reed withdrew due to Chris Reed's knee injury.
 On 10 February 2015, Philippines' Michael Christian Martinez withdrew due to hip and ankle injury.
 On 13 February 2015, Chinese ice dancers Zhang Yiyi / Wu Nan withdrew before the free dance due to Yiyi's injury.

Schedule
All times are Korea Standard Time (UTC+9).

Overview and record 
2014 Men's champion Takahito Mura & Pair's Champions Wenjing Sui / Cong Han participated in the competition. 2014 Ladies' champion Kanako Murakami & Ice dancing champions Madison Hubbell / Zachary Donohue did not defend their titles as they were not selected by their respected National associations to compete at the 2015 Four Continents Figure Skating Championships.

Argentina was represented by a skater at the Four Continents Championships for the first time in history.

Results

Men

Final results

Short program
In the Short Program, the Program Component Score (PCS) is calculated by adding the averaged score of each of the five different components (each component is originally out of 10 marks)- Skating Skills (SS), Transitions & Linking Footwork (TR), Performance & Execution (PE), Choreography & Composition (CH) and Interpretation (IN). That total is then multiplied by 1.00. In other words, the Program Component Score is marked out of 50 points.

Free skating
In the Free Skating, the Program Component Score (PCS) is calculated by adding the averaged score of each of the five different components (each component is originally out of 10 marks)- Skating Skills (SS), Transitions & Linking Footwork (TR), Performance & Execution (PE), Choreography & Composition (CH) and Interpretation (IN). That total is then multiplied by 2.00. In other words, the Program Component Score is marked out of 100 points.

Ladies

Final results

Short program
In the Short Program, the Program Component Score (PCS) is calculated by adding the averaged score of each of the five different components (each component is originally out of 10 marks)- Skating Skills (SS), Transitions & Linking Footwork (TR), Performance & Execution (PE), Choreography & Composition (CH) and Interpretation (IN). That total is then multiplied by 0.80. In other words, the Program Component Score is marked out of 40 points.

Free skating
In the Free Skating, the Program Component Score (PCS) is calculated by adding the averaged score of each of the five different components (each component is originally out of 10 marks)- Skating Skills (SS), Transitions & Linking Footwork (TR), Performance & Execution (PE), Choreography & Composition (CH) and Interpretation (IN). That total is then multiplied by 1.60. In other words, the Program Component Score is marked out of 80 points.

Pairs

Final results

Short program
In the Short Program, the Program Component Score (PCS) is calculated by adding the averaged score of each of the five different components (each component is originally out of 10 marks)- Skating Skills (SS), Transitions & Linking Footwork (TR), Performance & Execution (PE), Choreography & Composition (CH) and Interpretation (IN). That total is then multiplied by 0.80. In other words, the Program Component Score is marked out of 40 points.

Free skating
In the Free Skating, the Program Component Score (PCS) is calculated by adding the averaged score of each of the five different components (each component is originally out of 10 marks)- Skating Skills (SS), Transitions & Linking Footwork (TR), Performance & Execution (PE), Choreography & Composition (CH) and Interpretation (IN). That total is then multiplied by 1.60. In other words, the Program Component Score is marked out of 80 points.

Ice dancing

Final results

Short dance
In the Short Dance, the Program Component Score (PCS) is calculated by adding the averaged score of each of the five different components (each component is originally out of 10 marks)- Skating Skills (SS), Transitions & Linking Footwork (TR), Performance & Execution (PE), Choreography & Composition (CC) and Interpretation & Timing (IT). That total is then multiplied by 0.80. In other words, the Program Component Score is marked out of 40 points.

Free dance
In the Free Dance, the Program Component Score (PCS) is calculated by adding the averaged score of each of the five different components (each component is originally out of 10 marks)- Skating Skills (SS), Transitions & Linking Footwork (TR), Performance & Execution (PE), Choreography & Composition (CC) and Interpretation & Timing (IT). That total is then multiplied by 1.20. In other words, the Program Component Score is marked out of 60 points.

Medals summary

Medalists
Medals for overall placement:

Small medals for placement in the short segment:

Small medals for placement in the free segment:

Medals by country
Table of medals for overall placement:

Table of small medals for placement in the short segment:

Table of small medals for placement in the free segment:

Prize money
Prize money is awarded to skaters who achieve a top 12 placement in each discipline as follows:

References

External links
 
 2015 Four Continents at the International Skating Union
 Event Overview at the International Skating Union
 Starting Orders/Detailed Results at the International Skating Union
 Protocol at the International Skating Union

Four Continents Figure Skating Championships
Four Continents Figure Skating Championships, 2015
Four Continents
Four Continents Figure Skating Championships
2015 in South Korean sport
International figure skating competitions hosted by South Korea